Louis Claude Purser, FBA (28 September 1854 in Abbeyside – 20 March 1932 in Dublin) was an Irish classical scholar.

Purser was educated at Midleton College, County Cork, and Portora Royal School, Enniskillen, where a fellow pupil and student of classics was Oscar Wilde.

Purser was a tutor at Trinity College, Dublin, from 1881 to 1898. In 1897, he was appointed as Professor of Latin there. He collaborated with Dr. Robert Yelverton Tyrrell on the translation of the letters of Cicero. 

Purser and Arthur Palmer completed the editorial work for the final volumes of James Henry’s Aeneidea, a detailed commentary on Virgil’s Aeneid, after the death of John Fletcher Davies, the editor originally appointed by Henry’s trustees.

He was the brother of the Irish artist Sarah Purser. His niece Olive Purser was the first woman scholar in TCD. He is buried at Mount Jerome Cemetery.

References

External links
 

1854 births
1932 deaths
Irish translators
Latin–English translators
People from County Waterford
Burials at Mount Jerome Cemetery and Crematorium
People educated at Portora Royal School
People educated at Midleton College